Herberth Marcelo Díaz Rivas, known as Marcelo Díaz (born 19 April 2000) is a Salvadoran football player. He plays for Once Deportivo.

International career
He made his debut for the El Salvador national football team on 7 October 2021 in a World Cup qualifier against Panama.

References

External links
 
 

2000 births
Living people
Salvadoran footballers
El Salvador international footballers
Association football midfielders
Alianza F.C. footballers
Salvadoran Primera División players